HNoMS Kong Sverre (His Norwegian Majesty's Ship Kong Sverre) was a steam and sail powered frigate built for the Royal Norwegian Navy, and launched in 1860. Conceived and designed as possibly the most advanced wooden naval ship built, she was obsolete by the time she was delivered.

In 1932, an effort was made to raise 30,000 Norwegian kroner in order to preserve the ship, but it failed and she was eventually scrapped.

References

Frigates of the Royal Norwegian Navy
Ships built in Horten
1860 ships